Shankar Subramaniam Narayan (12 November 1934 – 5 August 2021), also known as S. S. "Babu" Narayan, was a footballer who represented India as a goalkeeper at the 1956 and 1960 Olympic Games.

Playing career
In club football, Narayan played for Tata SC and retired from the game in 1970, being replaced as goalkeeper at the club by Bandya Kakade. In 2013, he was felicitated by the Mumbai District Football Association for his contributions to Indian football. He was also a popular performer at the basketball court.

Honours

India
AFC Asian Cup runners-up: 1964
Colombo Cup: 1955
Merdeka Tournament runner-up: 1959

References

External links
 

1934 births
2021 deaths
Indian footballers
Association football goalkeepers
India international footballers
1964 AFC Asian Cup players
Footballers at the 1956 Summer Olympics
Footballers at the 1960 Summer Olympics
Olympic footballers of India
Footballers at the 1958 Asian Games
Asian Games competitors for India
People from Ottapalam
Footballers from Kerala
Mumbai Football League players